Danny Earl Britt Jr. (born July 6, 1979) is a Republican member of the North Carolina Senate, having represented the 24th district and its predecessors since 2017. He is a Lt. Colonel in the North Carolina Army National Guard. Britt is the first Republican to have been elected to the seat since the Reconstruction Era.

Committee assignments

2021-2022 session
Appropriations/Base Budget
Appropriations - Justice and Public Safety (Chair)
Judiciary (Chair)
Transportation (Chair)
Commerce and Insurance
Finance
Health Care

2019-2020 session
Appropriations/Base Budget
Appropriations - Justice and Public Safety (Chair)
Judiciary (Chair)
Transportation
Pensions, Retirement and Aging
Redistricting and Elections

2017-2018 session
Appropriations - Justice and Public Safety
Agriculture/Environment/Natural Resources
Judiciary
State and Local Government
Transportation

Electoral history

2022

2020

2018

2016

References

|-

Living people
1979 births
People from Lumberton, North Carolina
Appalachian State University alumni
Oklahoma City University School of Law alumni
Republican Party North Carolina state senators
21st-century American politicians